The following is a list of recurring Saturday Night Live characters and sketches introduced during the fortieth season of SNL, which began on September 27, 2014.

Hollywood Game Night
A parody of the TV quiz show of the same name, with host Jane Lynch (played by Kate McKinnon) continually irritated by the cluelessness of the celebrity participants.

How 2 Dance With Janelle
Janelle's (Sasheer Zamata) YouTube dance show is interrupted by her parents, concerned about the sexual nature of the videos and the presence of her obviously aroused friend Teddy Paskowitz (Kyle Mooney).

High school theater show
A high school theater troupe attempts to open its audience's eyes and tackle big subjects during a very self-aggrandizing play.

Cathy Anne Vanderbilt
A chain-smoking and disheveled woman played by Cecily Strong who serves as friend and mentor to various fairy-tale characters. She transitioned to Weekend Update appearances at the beginning of season 42.

Right Side of the Bed!
An Atlanta based morning talk-show presented by husband and wife Cory and Gracelynn Chisholm (Taran Killam and Cecily Strong). Awkward moments abound when the camera regularly cuts to guests pressured to be entertaining. The sketch is a spoof of the reality show Chrisley Knows Best.

Heather, a one-dimensional female character from a male-driven comedy 
Cecily Strong embodies all the clichés of the female love interest during Weekend Update.

Treece Henderson and his band 
Kenan Thompson (as vocalist Treece Henderson), Kyle Mooney (as keyboard player Brad Dates) and the episode's host (as a woodwind player who is also Treece's roommate) play a band who perform gigs at a series of lodges, hotels and dive bars, with Treece alternating between singing an energetic jazz-funk song and onstage banter that inappropriately delves into the private life of the host's character, who is reluctant to discuss a vague, but serious-sounding issue.

Willie
Michael Che's neighbor who is an overtly optimistic man who appears on Weekend Update and is played by Kenan Thompson

Frida Santini
Weekend update character played by Kate McKinnon. She is a middle age woman who lives in Colin Jost's building and writes passive-aggressive notes to her neighbors.

Hunk sketches 
A parody of the reality TV show The Bachelor, in which a single man must find true love with a contestant of his choosing.

Riblet
Michael Che's high school friend, played by Bobby Moynihan. He likes to interrupt Che during Weekend Update and make fun of how easy reading cue cards is.

Totino's lady
An unnamed spokeswoman for Totino's (Vanessa Bayer) would do anything for her "hungry guys". But while her "hungry guys" are watching the Super Bowl, she is doing things of her own.

Brother 2 Brother
A Disney Channel sitcom based around two twin students played by Taran Killam and Chris Hemsworth. When Marky switches places in class with his much more muscular brother Matty, no one falls for it...

The House
A parody of The Real World and other reality TV shows starring Beck Bennett, Kyle Mooney and the episode's host as castmembers/houseguests.

Gerard, a former acting coach on The Jeffersons 
Gerard, a movie director (Kenan Thompson), is convinced that the drama he is shooting will be more powerful and moving if his actors act like they're in a broad 70's sitcom.

Gemma 
Gene Diradusio and his wife Lisa (Kenan Thompson and Vanessa Bayer) bump into a former acquaintance of Gene's, accompanied by his girlfriend, aspiring British singer Gemma (Cecily Strong). The boyfriend makes the couple uncomfortable by making relentlessly inappropriate comments about Gemma's attractiveness, while Gene is too scared to ask them to leave.

The Janet Johnson-Luna Civil Trial  
32-year-old Janet Johnson-Luna (Cecily Strong) is prosecuted for having sex with 16-year-old student Gavin Daly (Pete Davidson). His mother (Kate McKinnon) is suing Luna on behalf of Gavin for emotional damage, but Gavin's testimony only proves how nontraumatic the experience was for him. Also featured in the sketch are Kenan Thompson as the judge, Bobby Moynihan as Gavin's father, and Beck Bennett and Aidy Bryant as reporters Bill Arnold and Paula Abbott.

Kinky Elves 
Elves (Kenan Thompson, Vanessa Bayer, and, in the final two skits, the episode's host) purposefully botch their jobs and gleefully wait for their master to give them the punishment they deserve and desire.

References

Lists of recurring Saturday Night Live characters and sketches
Saturday Night Live in the 2010s